Macaroeris nidicolens is a species of jumping spider that occurs from Europe to Central Asia.

Description

The male has reddish brown hairs surrounding its frontal eyes. Two white stripes reach along the prosoma towards the opisthosoma (abdomen). Several white spots cover the top of the prosoma, one bigger each behind the posterior lateral eyes. A white arch covers the anterior end of the abdomen, with pairs of white specks further down, four of which form a slanted cross near the posterior end.

The female is colored much lighter than the male. A white triangle sits in the middle of the prosoma, while the abdomen matches the male's.

Color and patterning can vary strongly in this species. Both sexes have black, curves tufts of hair on the sides behind the anterior lateral eyes.

Habitat
Macaroeris nidicolens prefers bushes in warm, dry, sunny to half-shaded areas.

Distribution
The species is found from Europe to Central Asia. In Germany it was found first in 1995 (Cologne), and seems to expand its area further.

Name
The species name is derived from Latin, and means "inhabiting a nest".

References

 Spinnen-Forum.de: Macaroeris nidicolens (see there for more detailed sources)
 Bellmann H. (2010): Der Kosmos Spinnenführer: Über 400 Arten Europas. Kosmos. 1. Auflage. 
  (2012): The world spider catalog, version 12.5. American Museum of Natural History.

External resources
 Pictures and diagnostic drawings of male and female M. nidicolens

Salticidae
Spiders of Europe
Spiders of Asia
Spiders described in 1802
Taxa named by Charles Athanase Walckenaer